The Vietnam Football Federation (VFF), more formally the Football Federation of the Socialist Republic of Vietnam, is the governing body of football in Vietnam. It is responsible for the all Vietnam teams of association football, futsal and beach soccer as well as national competitions.

VFF is currently a member of the International Federation of Association Football (FIFA), the Asian Football Confederation (AFC), and the ASEAN Football Federation (AFF). Its headquarters is located in Lê Quang Đạo Street, Mỹ Đình 1 ward, Nam Từ Liêm district, Hanoi.

History

In 1960, Vietnam Football Association was established in the North. Its first president Hà Đăng Ấn, head of Railway Department and a former football star. In the South under control of the Republic of Vietnam, a similar Association was also founded to administer football activities in the South.

Football has been played in Vietnam since the early 20th century, however, due to the war, it had not been developed into a movement. Due to the division of Vietnam, football was played differently in the two parts of the country until 1975.

In 1989, following the Đổi Mới reforms, Vietnamese sports began to return to international events. After three months of preparation, in August 1989, the First Congress of the new football federation took place in Hanoi, declaring Vietnam Football Federation. Trịnh Ngọc Chữ, deputy minister of General Department of Sports, was elected president of VFF and Lê Thế Thọ was appointed general secretary.

Main board

President
The current president of VFF is Trần Quốc Tuấn.

Presidents
Trịnh Ngọc Chữ (1989–1991) 
Dương Nghiệp Chí (acting, 1991–1993) 
Đoàn Văn Xê (1993–1997) 
Mai Văn Muôn (1997–2001) 
Hồ Đức Việt (2001–2003)
Trần Duy Ly (acting, January–August 2003)
Mai Liêm Trực (2003–2005)
Nguyễn Trọng Hỷ (2005–2013)
Lê Hùng Dũng (2013–2018)
Lê Khánh Hải (2018–2021)
Trần Quốc Tuấn (2021–)

Executive committee
Trần Quốc Tuấn – Permanent deputy chairman
Cao Văn Chóng – 1st Deputy chairman
Lê Văn Thành – 2nd Deputy chairman

Secretary-General
Lê Thế Ngọ (1989–1993)
Trần Bẩy (1993–1997)
Phạm Ngọc Viễn (1997–2005)
Trần Quốc Tuấn (2005–2011)
Ngô Lê Bằng (2011–2014)
Lê Hoài Anh (2014–2022)
Dương Nghiệp Khôi (2022–)

Affiliated committees
 Council of Referees
 Women's Committee
 Sports Medical Committee
 External affairs Committee
 Communication Committee
 Committee of movements and member organizations
 Committee of Development Strategy
 Committee of Professional Football
 Committee of Complaints
 Inspection Committee
 National council of Coaches
 Marketing and Sponsorship Committee

Regional federations
40 provincial federations are constituent members of VFF:

North
 Hà Nội Football Federation
 Hà Tĩnh Football Federation
 Hà Nam Football Federation
 Hải Dương Football Federation
 Hải Phòng Football Federation
 Hưng Yên Football Federation
 Hòa Bình Football Federation
 Lạng Sơn Football Federation
 Nam Định Football Federation
 Nghệ An Football Federation
 Quảng Ninh Football Federation
 Phú Thọ Football Federation
 Thái Nguyên Football Federation
 Thanh Hóa Football Federation

Central
 Bình Định Football Federation
 Đà Nẵng Football Federation
 Đắk Lắk Football Federation
 Gia Lai Football Federation
 Khánh Hòa Football Federation    
 Kon Tum Football Federation
 Lâm Đồng Football Federation
 Phú Yên Football Federation
 Quảng Nam Football Federation
 Quảng Ngãi Football Federation
 Thừa Thiên–Huế Football Federation

South
 An Giang Football Federation
 Bà Rịa–Vũng Tàu Football Federation
 Bến Tre Football Federation
 Bình Dương Football Federation
 Bình Phước Football Federation
 Cà Mau Football Federation
 Cần Thơ Football Federation
 Đồng Nai Football Federation
 Đồng Tháp Football Federation
 Hồ Chí Minh City Football Federation
 Kiên Giang Football Federation
 Long An Football Federation
 Tây Ninh Football Federation
 Tiền Giang Football Federation
 Vĩnh Long Football Federation

Competitions

Domestic leagues

For men
V.League 1
V.League 2
V.League 3
V.League 4
Vietnamese National U-21 Football Championship
Vietnamese National U-19 Football Championship
Vietnamese National U-17 Football Championship
Vietnamese National U-15 Football Championship
Vietnamese National U-13 Football Championship
Vietnamese National U-11 Football Championship
Vietnam National Futsal League
Vietnamese National Beach Soccer League

For women
Vietnam Women's Football Championship
Vietnamese National Women's U-19 Football Championship
Vietnamese National Women's U-16 Football Championship

Domestic cups
 Vietnamese National Football Cup
 Vietnamese National Football Super Cup
 Vietnamese National Futsal Cup
 Women's Vietnamese Cup

National teams

Men
 Vietnam national football team 
Vietnam national under-23 football team
 Vietnam national under-22 football team
 Vietnam national under-20 football team
 Vietnam national under-16 football team
 Vietnam national under-14 football team
 Vietnam national futsal team
 Vietnam national under-20 futsal team
 Vietnam national beach soccer team

Women
 Vietnam women's national football team
 Vietnam women's national Olympic football team
 Vietnam women's national under-19 football team
 Vietnam women's national under-16 football team
 Vietnam women's national under-14 football team
 Vietnam women's national futsal team

Logo 
The current logo of the VFF portrays the picture of a football along with the Vietnamese flag. It is designed by Nguyễn Công Quang and has been used since 2008 until now.

Sponsorship 
Primary sponsors include: Grand Sport, Honda, Vinamilk, Yanmar, Sony, LS Group, Coca-Cola, Kao Vietnam, TNI Corporation, Z.com, Harbalife Vietnam, Acecook, Gia Đình Attack, Hưng Thịnh Land, Hưng Thịnh Corporation and King Coffee.

See also
 Agribank Cup
 VTV-T&T Cup
 Football in Vietnam

References

External links
  Official Site
  Vietnam Football Federation site
 Vietnam at AFC site
 Vietnam at FIFA site
 Vietnam Football on Facebook 
 VFF Channel on YouTube

1960 establishments in North Vietnam
Football in Vietnam
Vietnam
Sports organizations established in 1960